Nadadores is one of the 38 municipalities of Coahuila, in north-eastern Mexico. The municipal seat lies at Nadadores. The municipality covers an area of 834.7 km².

As of 2005, the municipality had a total population of 5,822.

References

Municipalities of Coahuila